Glüsing is a municipality in the district of Dithmarschen, in Schleswig-Holstein, Germany. On 1 April 1934, the municipality was formed due to the disbandment of the Amt Kirchspielslandgemeinde Tellingstedt which at the time, had around 85 inhabitants.

References

Municipalities in Schleswig-Holstein
Dithmarschen